Killed by 9V Batteries is an Austrian indie rock band.

Biography
Founded in Graz in 2002, the members entered a temporary hiatus in 2005. However in the same year, they re-grouped and later signed to the Vienna-based indie label Siluh Records and released three full-length albums there.

Around 2015 the band went on a second hiatus and front singer Wolfgang Möstl worked out his solo act Mile Me Deaf to a three member band. This band is in sound similar to Killed by 9 Volt Batteries, though a bit less noisy. In Mile Me Deaf he is the lead singer and plays guitar and occasionally on a Home Swinger. In 2018 he scaled down this project to a solo act again with a more electronic output with samplers, drum computers and him on guitar and vocals. Möstl also plays guitar in the bands Sex Jams, and the sludge rockband Melt Downer. Möstl also plays guitar in the live band of Clara Luzia.

Discography
Rascals Kill Wild Wild Rascals (CD, Numavi, 2004)
Rough (CD, Numavi, 2004)
Powerchord Desaster (CD, Numavi, 2005)
Ford Mustang (CD-Single, Numavi, 2005)
Killed by 9V Batteries (CD, Siluh, 2006)
Split 7" w/ "Jolly Goods" (7", Louisville/Siluh, 2008)
Split Cassette w/ "Black Fox Dance" (MC, Wilhelm Show Me The Major Label, 2008)
Escape Plans Make It Hard To Wait For Success (CD/LP, Siluh, 2008)
Split LP w/ "Picture Eyes" (LP, Siluh/Numavi, 2009)
 The Crux (LP Siluh, 2011)

Albums
 Leave a Light on, 2008
 That's the crap we dance to, 2009
 Mile Me Deaf (1st Tape), 2009
 a blast from da past, 2012
 Eat Skull, 2012
 Holography, 2014
 Gold Kid (16 Minute Version), 2014
 Singlestringer, 2014
 Eerie Bits of Future Trips, 2015, album
 The Run, 2016
 Alien Age, 2017

EPs and Singles
 Sisters of Marcy D'arcy, 2009 EP
 Brando EP, 2013
 Shiver, 2014 single
 Out Of Breath At Ego Death wolf/beat Remix, 2014 single
 All That She Wants (Ace Of Base Cover), Single, 2013
 Bologna English Type / Creepy Lounge Version (Wanda Cover), 2015, single
 Light Ltd. EP, 2015
 She's quite alright, 2015 single
 Dig Deep, 2016 single
 Blowout / Wayout 7", 2016
 Alien Age (Fazo Jellinek Remix), single
 Voyage, 2017 single
 Light Ltd., 2017 single

References

External links
Official Site
Killed by 9V Batteries on Bandcamp

Austrian indie rock groups
Musical groups established in 2002
Universal Music Group artists
2002 establishments in Austria